The Money and Pensions Service (sometimes stylised as Money & Pensions Service or MaPS) is an organisation whose statutory objective is to develop and co-ordinate a national strategy to improve people’s financial capabilities. The service provides impartial, free money and pensions guidance directly to consumers online and by telephone. Through partnerships, it also provides debt advice and pensions freedoms guidance to consumers, along with offering organisations such as employers syndicated money guidance content from its website.

The organisation was set up by the UK Government and is paid for by a statutory levy on the financial services industry. It is an arm’s-length body of the Department for Work and Pensions.

MaPS is the largest funder of debt advice in England.

The service's chair is Sir Hector Sants. In January 2020, Caroline Siarkiewicz was appointed as CEO.

History
The service was launched in January 2019, combining the Money Advice Service, The Pensions Advisory Service and Pension Wise to form a single financial guidance body. The decision to merge the organisations into one body was originally announced in March 2016 by HM Treasury and confirmed in the Queen's Speech of June 2017. In March 2021, MaPS announced that it would be consolidating its three legacy consumer brands into one brand called MoneyHelper, to provide a better and enhanced consumer experience and a single source of information and guidance.

References

External links
 
 MoneyHelper

Personal finance education
HM Treasury
Private companies limited by guarantee of the United Kingdom
Government agencies established in 2019
Advice organizations